
Gmina Turośl is a rural gmina (administrative district) in Kolno County, Podlaskie Voivodeship, in north-eastern Poland.

Villages
Gmina Turośl contains the villages and settlements of Adamusy, Charubin, Charubiny, Cieciory, Cieloszka, Dudy Nadrzeczne, Krusza, Ksebki, Łacha, Leman, Nowa Ruda, Popiołki, Potasie, Ptaki, Pudełko, Pupki, Samule, Szablaki, Trzcińskie, Turośl, Wanacja and Zimna.

Neighbouring gminas
Gmina Turośl is bordered by the gminas of Kolno, Łyse, Pisz and Zbójna.

References
Polish official population figures 2006

Turosl
Kolno County